The 1945–46 international cricket season was from September 1945 to April 1946.

Season overview

November

Australia in India

December

Australia in Ceylon

March

Australia in New Zealand

References

International cricket competitions by season
1945 in cricket
1946 in cricket